William Inwood Smith (November 26, 1915 – January 15, 1995) was an All-American football player for the Ohio State University Buckeyes in the mid-1930s.  A native of New Jersey, he moved with his family to Mansfield, Ohio as a boy.  In addition to football, Smith was a competitive swimmer, basketball player, and track and field athlete.  At the end of the 1935 college football season, Smith was selected as a first-team All-American by Grantland Rice for Collier's Weekly and by a board of coaches for Pathé News.  After graduating from Ohio State, Smith was employed by the Westinghouse Electric Manufacturing Co. in Grand Rapids, Michigan, and Cleveland.  During World War II, Smith became district supervisor of the Office of Price Administration in Columbus, Ohio.

See also
 1935 College Football All-America Team

References

1915 births
1995 deaths
American football guards
Ohio State Buckeyes football players
Players of American football from Ohio